Ballycolman (Irish: Baile Uí Colmain ) is a townland of 588 acres in County Tyrone, Northern Ireland, now part of Strabane. It is situated in the historic barony of Strabane Lower and the civil parish of Urney.

The name derives from the Irish: Baile Uí Colmain (Colman's town).

The population of the townland declined during the 19th century:

It was then subsumed into Strabane. It is best known for Ballycolman housing estate in Strabane, and also has a community centre, nursery school and industrial estate.

See also
List of townlands of County Tyrone

References

Townlands of County Tyrone
Civil parish of Urney